Nikola Radulović (born 26 April 1973) is a Croatian-born Italian former professional basketball player. He was born in Croatia but later gained Italian citizenship and played for the Italian national basketball team.

Professional career
Radulović began his basketball career in his native Croatia where he played with Olimpija Osijek, Croatia Line Rijeka, Cibona and Šibenik. He later played with the following clubs: Sporting Athens, Basket Napoli, ASVEL Basket, DKV Joventut, Fórum Valladolid, Azovmash, Air Avellino, Enel Brindisi and Scafati Basket.

He won the French League championship in 2002, while playing with ASVEL Basket. He also won the Italian Cup in 2008, while playing with Air Avellino.

National team career
Radulović played with the senior Italian national basketball team from 2001 till 2004. He won the silver medal at the 2004 Summer Olympics and the bronze medal at the EuroBasket 2003. He also played at the EuroBasket 2001.

References

External links

 Nikola Radulović at acb.com 
 Nikola Radulović at legabasket.it 
 Nikola Radulović at legaduebasket.it 
 Nikola Radulović at euroleague.net

1973 births
Living people
ASVEL Basket players
Basketball players at the 2004 Summer Olympics
BC Azovmash players
CB Valladolid players
Croatian men's basketball players
Italian men's basketball players
Italian people of Croatian descent
Joventut Badalona players
KK Cibona players
KK Šibenik players
Lega Basket Serie A players
Liga ACB players
Medalists at the 2004 Summer Olympics
New Basket Brindisi players
Olympic basketball players of Italy
Olympic silver medalists for Italy
Olympic medalists in basketball
Power forwards (basketball)
Sporting basketball players
Basketball players from Zagreb
S.S. Felice Scandone players
KK Kvarner players
Italian expatriate sportspeople in Ukraine